The International Port of Memphis is an active port in Memphis, Tennessee, United States. It is mainly located on President's Island, which is a peninsula. However, it also extends between miles 725 and 740 on both the Tennessee and Arkansas sides of the Mississippi River. It is the second largest inland port on the shallow draft portion of the Mississippi River, and the fifth largest inland port in the United States. It has the ability to connect to sea via the Mississippi River, by rail using any of the five Class 1 railroads in the city, by road via I-40 or I-55, and by air using FedEx.

History

In 1946, the City of Memphis and Shelby County governments developed a concept for a new industrial area with river access that was separate from downtown, but close enough for commerce. The chosen location for this concept was President's Island. However, President's Island was a flood plain; this was resolved by the creation of a closure dam connecting the northern tip of the island to shore. A harbor was dredged on the slack waterside of the island, with the materials retrieved from dredging being used to raise land along the slack water to create an industrial park.

Companies 
A partial list of companies located at the Port of Memphis as listed on their website (2021) include:

 ADM Grain Company
 ADM Riverport
 Bunge
 Bunge North America
 Buzzi Unicem, USA
CHS
 CN Railway
 Cargill, Inc.
 Cargill Corn Milling NA
 Exxon Mobil Corporation
GlaxoSmithKline
 LaFarge North America
 Lucy Woodstock Marine Terminal
 Memphis & Shelby County Port Commission
 NexAir
 Phoenix Manufacturing Company
 Republic Steel
 TVA-Allen Combined Cycle Plant
 U.S. Postal Service
 Valero Memphis Refinery
 Vulcan Materials Company

References

Memphis, Tennessee
River ports of the United States
Ports and harbors of Tennessee